The 2014 FAI Senior Challenge Cup, also known as the 2014 FAI Ford Senior Cup, was the 94th season of the national football competition of the Republic of Ireland. The winners of the competition earned a spot in the first qualifying round of the 2015–16 UEFA Europa League.

A total of 40 teams competed in the 2014 competition, which commenced in March 2014. The teams entered from the 2014 League of Ireland Premier Division and First Division received byes into the second round stage. Four non-league clubs also received byes to the second round. The remaining 12 teams entered at the first round stage. These non-league teams are composed of the sixteen clubs, which reached the fourth round of the 2013–14 FAI Intermediate Cup and the semi-finalists of the FAI Junior Cup in 2013–14.

Teams

First round

Second round

Replay

Third round

First legs

Replays

Quarter-finals

Replays

Semi-finals

Replay

Final

References

External links
Full Fixtures and Results

 
FAI Cup seasons